Ivy Queen is a Puerto Rican singer and songwriter who has received awards and nominations for her contributions to the music industry, specifically in Latin music and several of its subgenres. Having sold more than two million records, she is the most successful female reggaetón artist and the "only significant female reggaetón rapper" according to The New York Times. Ivy Queen is commonly referred to as the "Queen of Reggaetón" in a genre dominated by male singers, and has become the "indisputable lead female voice of not only Latin urban and reggaetón music but an international icon for Latin music itself" according to the president of Universal Music Latino.

In 2006, Ivy Queen received the first Premio Juventud "Diva Award", which honored the singer for her musical career and is her only Premio Juventud thus far. In 2009, "Dime", from the album Ivy Queen 2008 World Tour Live!, became her most nominated work at the Billboard Latin Music Award ceremony, where she was awarded both "Hot Latin Song of the Year, Female" and "Tropical Airplay Song of the Year, Female" out of five total nominations. Later in 2010, the song gained Ivy Queen an award from the American Society of Composers, Authors and Publishers (ASCAP) for "Urban Song of the Year".

At the Broadcast Music, Inc. (BMI) Awards, Ivy Queen has been given the "Award-Winning Song" award for "Cuéntale", "Te He Querido, Te He Llorado", "Dime", and, most recently in 2012, "La Vida Es Así". Sentimiento, Ivy Queen's sixth studio album, nominated three times for three different awards, was nominated at the Latin Grammy Awards of 2007 for "Best Urban Music Album", her first Latin Grammy nomination. Queen has received ten nominations from the Billboard Latin Music Awards. Flashback, Ivy Queen's fifth studio album has been nominated a total of three times, while Drama Queen, her seventh studio album follows with two nominations. As of January 2023, Ivy Queen has received twenty-eight awards from fifty-seven nominations.

Latin Grammy Awards
The Latin Grammy Awards are awarded annually by the Latin Academy of Recording Arts & Sciences in the United States. Ivy Queen has won once from four nominations.

|-
|rowspan="1" scope="row"| 
|scope="row"| Sentimiento
|rowspan="3" scope="row"| Best Urban Music Album
|
|-
|rowspan="1" scope="row"| 
|scope="row"| Drama Queen
|
|-
|rowspan="1" scope="row"| 
|scope="row"| Musa
|
|-
|rowspan="1" scope="row"| 
| Herself
|scope="row"| Leading Ladies of Entertainment 
|
|-

Billboard Latin Music Awards
The Billboard Latin Music Awards are awarded annually by Billboard magazine in the United States. Ivy Queen has received two awards from eleven nominations.

|-
|rowspan="3" scope="row"|2005
|scope="row"|"Intro – Los 12 Discípulos"
|scope="row"|Tropical Airplay Track of the Year, New Artist
|
|-
|scope="row"|"Dile"
|scope="row"|Tropical Airplay Track of the Year, Female
|
|-
|scope="row"|Diva: Platinum Edition
|rowspan="3" scope="row"|Reggaeton Album of the Year
|
|-
|rowspan="1" scope="row"|2006
|scope="row"|Flashback
|
|-
|rowspan="2" scope="row"|2008
|scope="row"|Sentimiento
|
|-
|"Que Lloren"
|scope="row"|Latin Dance Club Play Track of the Year
|
|-
|rowspan="3" scope="row"|2009
|rowspan="3" scope="row"|"Dime"
|scope="row"|Hot Latin Song of the Year, Female
|
|-
|scope="row"|Tropical Airplay Track of the Year, Female
|
|-
|scope="row"|Latin Rhythm Airplay Track of the Year, Solo
|
|-
|rowspan="2" scope="row"|2011
|rowspan="2" scope="row"|Herself
|scope="row"|Hot Latin Songs Artist of the Year, Female
|
|-
|scope="row"|Top Latin Albums Artist of the Year, Female
|

Billboard Women in Music Awards
Billboard Women in Music is an annual event held by Billboard. In 2023, Ivy Queen was recognized with the Icon Award, "given to accomplished women who have made historic contributions to the music industry."

|-
|rowspan="1" scope="row"|2023
|scope="row"|Herself
|scope="row"|Icon Award
|
|-

American Society of Composers, Authors and Publishers Awards
The ASCAP Awards are awarded annually by the American Society of Composers, Authors and Publishers in the United States. Ivy Queen won the one award for which she was nominated.

|-
|rowspan="1" scope="row"|2009
|scope="row"|"Dime"
|scope="row"|Urban Song of the Year
|
|-

Broadcast Music, Inc. Awards
Broadcast Music, Inc. (BMI) annually hosts award shows that honor the songwriters, composers and music publishers of the year's most-performed songs in the BMI catalog. Ivy Queen received all four awards for which she was nominated.

|-
|rowspan="2" scope="row"|2007
|scope="row"|"Cuéntale"
|rowspan="4" scope="row"|Award-Winning Songs
|
|-
|scope="row"|"Te He Querido, Te He Llorado"
|
|-
|rowspan="1" scope="row"|2010
|scope="row"|"Dime"
|
|-
|rowspan="1" scope="row"|2012
|scope="row"|"La Vida Es Así"
|
|-

Premios Juventud
The Premios Juventud are awarded annually by the television network Univision in the United States. Ivy Queen has received one award from six nominations.

|-
|rowspan="2" scope="row"| 2005
|rowspan="6" scope="row"| Herself
|scope="row"|Voice of the Moment, Female
|
|-
|scope="row"|Favorite Urban Artist
|
|-
|rowspan="2" scope="row"|2006
|Diva Award
|
|-
|rowspan="3" scope="row"|Favorite Urban Artist
|
|-
|rowspan="1" scope="row"|2007
|
|-
|scope="row"|2008
|
|-
|rowspan="1" scope="row"|2022
|scope="row"| "Pa' Mí"
|Best Tropical Collaboration
|
|-

Premios Icono
The Premios Icono Awards are presented annually by the Latin Urban Conference in Colombia. In 2021, she was awarded the Urban Icon Award in recognition of her musical achievements and inspiration on the Latin urban music genre.

|-
|rowspan="1" scope="row"|2021
|scope="row"|Herself
|scope="row"|Urban Icon Award
|
|-

Premio Lo Nuestro
The Premio Lo Nuestro Awards are awarded annually by the television network Univision in the United States. Ivy Queen has received one award from three nominations. At the 2023 award show Queen will be awarded the Musical Legacy recognizing her musical career within the urban genre.

|-
|rowspan="1" scope="row"| 2007
|scope="row"|Flashback
|rowspan="2" scope="row"| Urban Album of the Year
|
|-
|rowspan="1" scope="row"| 2008
|scope="row"|Sentimiento
|
|-
|rowspan="1" scope="row"| 2021
|rowspan="2" scope="row"|Herself
|scope="row"|Urban Artist of the Year, Female
|
|-
|rowspan="1" scope="row"| 2023
|scope="row"|Musical Legacy Award
|

Premios La Musa
The Premios La Musa awards are awarded annually by in the United States. Queen has been nominated twice.

|-
|rowspan="1" scope="row"| 2017
|rowspan="2" scope="row"|Herself
"Quiero Bailar"
"Que Lloren"
"La Vida es Así"
|rowspan="2" scope="row"| Latin Songwriters Hall of Fame
|
|-
|rowspan="1" scope="row"| 2019
|

Premios Tu Musica Urbano
The Premios Tu Música Urbano awards are awarded annually by Telemundo in the United States. Queen received recognition for her musical career at the award show's first ceremony.

|-
|rowspan="1" scope="row"| 2019
|rowspan="2" scope="row"| Herself
|rowspan="1" scope="row"| Lifetime Achievement Award
|
|-
|rowspan="2" scope="row"| 2020
|rowspan="1" scope="row"| Top Female Artist
|
|-
|scope="row"|Llego La Queen
|rowspan="1" scope="row"| Album of the Year, Female
|
|-
|rowspan="2" scope="row"| 2022
|rowspan="1" scope="row"| Herself
|rowspan="1" scope="row"| Top Female Artist
|
|-
|scope="row"| "Pa' Mí"
|rowspan="1" scope="row"| Top Urban Tropical Song
|

Hispanic Heritage Awards
The Hispanic Heritage Awards are presented annually by the Hispanic Heritage Foundation in the United States. At the 34th annual Hispanic Heritage Awards, Queen received the 2021 Vision Award, recognizing her musical career.

|-
|rowspan="1" scope="row"|2021
|scope="row"|Herself
|scope="row"|Vision Award
|
|-

International Dance Music Awards
The International Dance Music Awards are presented annually by the Winter Music Conference in the United States. Ivy Queen received has yet to receive an award from one nomination.

|-
|rowspan="1" scope="row"|2007
|scope="row"|"Cuéntale"
|scope="row"|Best Latin/Reggaetón Track
|
|-

International Reggae and World Music Awards
The International Reggae and World Music Awards are awarded annually in the United States. Ivy Queen received one award from one nomination.

|-
|rowspan="1" scope="row"|2004
|scope="row"|Herself
|scope="row"|Best Reggaetón Entertainer
|
|-

GLAAD Media Awards
The GLAAD Media Awards are awarded annually by the Gay & Lesbian Alliance Against Defamation in the United States. Ivy Queen received one award from one nomination.

|-
|rowspan="1" scope="row"|2008
|scope="row"|Herself
|scope="row"|Special Recognition
|
|-

El Premio De La Gente Latin Music Awards
The El Premio De La Gente Latin Music Awards are awarded annually by the Spanish-language television network Telemundo in the United States. Ivy Queen received no awards from two nominations.

|-
|rowspan="2" scope="row"|2005
|scope="row"|Herself
|scope="row"|Urban or Duranguense Artist or Group of the Year — Male or Female
|
|-
|scope="row"|Real
|scope="row"|Urban or Duranguense Album of the Year — Male or Female
|
|-

Premios Furia Musical
The Premios Furia Musical are award annually by the television network Televisa in Mexico. Ivy Queen has received one award from one nomination.

|-
|rowspan="1" scope="row"|2006
|scope="row"|Herself
|scope="row"|Best Reggaeton Singer of the Year
|
|-

Premios Texas
The Premios Texas Awards are presented annually by the television network Univision in the United States. Ivy Queen has received one award from one nomination.

|-
|rowspan="1" scope="row"|2012
|scope="row"|Herself
|scope="row"|Best Urban Artist
|
|-

People's Choice Reggaetón and Urban Awards
The People's Choice Reggaeton and Urban Awards are awarded annually by the public of Puerto Rico, who chooses their favorite artist in various categories. Ivy Queen has received four awards from five nominations.

|-
|rowspan="1" scope="row"|2004
|rowspan="3" scope="row"|Herself
|rowspan="2" scope="row"|Unknown
|
|-
|rowspan="1" scope="row"|2005
|
|-
|rowspan="3" scope="row"|2007
|scope="row"|Female Artist of the Year
|
|-
|scope="row"|"Te He Querido, Te He Llorado"
|scope="row"|Song with the Best Elaboration of Lyrics
|
|-
|scope="row"|Flashback
|scope="row"|Compilation Album of the Year
|
|-

Artista Awards
The Artista Awards are presented annually by Artista magazine in the United States. Queen has received two awards from two nominations.

|-
|rowspan="2" scope="row"|1997
|rowspan="2" scope="row"|Herself
|rowspan="1" scope="row"|Artista '97 (Artist of 1997)
|
|-
|rowspan="1" scope="row"|People's Favorite Rap Singer
|
|-

Megaton Awards
The Megaton Awards are presented annually by the SBS Reggaetón Network, composed of the American radio stations "Reggaeton 94.FM", "mega 97.9FM", "El Sol 95.7FM", and "Latino 96.3FM" in the United States. Queen has received one awards from one nomination.

|-
|rowspan="1" scope="row"|2005
|rowspan="1" scope="row"|Herself
|rowspan="1" scope="row"|Female Artist of the Year
|

National Festival of Rap and Reggae Awards
The National Festival of Rap and Reggae Awards are presented annually in the United States. Queen has received one award from one nomination. 

|-
|rowspan="1" scope="row"|1997
|rowspan="1" scope="row"|Herself
|rowspan="1" scope="row"|Rap Singer of the Year
|
|-

Other accolades

Billboard  Year-End Charts

Listicles

References

Queen, Ivy
Awards and nominations